Taxation in Scotland today involves payments that are required to be made to three different levels of government: to the UK government, to the Scottish Government and to local government. Currently 32.4% of taxation collected in Scotland is in the form of taxes under the control of the Scottish parliament and 67.6% of all taxation collected in Scotland goes directly to the UK government in taxation that is a reserved matter of the UK parliament.

History 
Until the 17th century, taxation was regarded as 'an extraordinary source of revenue that was levied for a specific purpose such as the defence of the realm'. However, during the 17th century, Parliament permitted a Land Tax to be collected from 1667, a Hearth tax from 1691-1695 and a Poll tax from 1693-1699.

The 1707 Union of the Kingdom of Scotland with the Kingdom of England formed a new Kingdom of Great Britain, so that responsibility for taxation in Scotland became a matter for the Westminster Parliament, now the legislature for the new state.

Devolution of tax powers 

The creation of a devolved Scottish parliament in 1999 was accompanied by a limited transfer of taxation powers: the Scotland Act 1998 transferred the power to legislate for local taxation and also the power to vary income tax by plus or minus 3 pence in the pound. Most taxation powers in Scotland following the creation of the parliament remained a reserved matter for Westminster. Following the Calman Commission, the Scotland Act 2012 transferred powers over Stamp duty Land Tax, and Landfill Tax (both since replaced by Land and Buildings Transaction Tax and Scottish Landfill Tax, respectively) and reduced rates of Income tax in Scotland by 10 pence in the pound at all bands, reducing the Barnett formula by the equivalent sum, and requiring the Scottish parliament to set a Scottish Income tax rate to replace the lost revenue but with the ability to set it higher or lower than 10 pence in the pound if it wished.

Following promises made during the Scottish independence referendum that led to the Smith Commission, the Scotland Act 2016 added powers over Air Passenger Duty and full control over Income tax on non savings and non dividend income (excluding the personal allowance which is still set by the UK parliament.)

Despite these tax powers having been transferred, over half of all taxes collected in Scotland remains under the direct control of the UK parliament which has remained a reserved matter to itself all powers over Corporation tax, National Insurance, Value-added tax (VAT), Capital gains tax, Inheritance tax, Aggregates Levy Insurance Premium Tax and Motoring taxes.

See also
Blanch fee
Buttock mail
Court of Exchequer (Scotland)
Edinburgh congestion charge
Full fiscal autonomy for Scotland
Government Expenditure and Revenue Scotland
Local income tax in Scotland
Taxation in the United Kingdom
Teind
Window tax

References